The Fordyce House is a historic house at 746 Park Avenue in Hot Springs, Arkansas.  It is a -story wood-frame structure, with a hip roof that has large cross-gabled gambrel dormers projecting in each direction.  It has a curved wraparound porch supported by Tuscan columns.  It was built in 1910 to a design by architect Charles L. Thompson, and is an excellent local example of Colonial Revival architecture.

The house was listed on the National Register of Historic Places in 1982.

See also
National Register of Historic Places listings in Garland County, Arkansas

References

Houses on the National Register of Historic Places in Arkansas
Colonial Revival architecture in Arkansas
Houses completed in 1910
Houses in Garland County, Arkansas
Houses in Hot Springs, Arkansas
National Register of Historic Places in Hot Springs, Arkansas